Footprints Studio was a textile printing workshop in the manner of the Arts and Crafts movement established by Celandine Kennington in 1925 at Durham Wharf in London's Hammersmith. Typical products were hand block printed fabric, curtains, coats and shawls. The name ‘Footprints’ is said to have been on account of the foot pressure workers applied to the blocks  to print onto fabric. Footprints was known for its preference of aniline dyes over vegetable dyes and lino blocks over wood.

The workshop was supervised by Gwen Pike and goods were sold through the shop ‘Modern Textiles' owned by Elspeth Little. Following the death of Gwen Pike and retirement of Celandine Kennington, Joyce Clissold (1903-1982) took over management of the workshop with Germaine Tallents.

In 1933 workshop moved to larger premises in Brentford and a new outlet opened New Bond Street followed by another in Knightsbridge two years later. By this stage the workshop employed up to 50 people, typically working class women.

The business declined with World War Two but remained active until Clissold's death in 1982.

Artists and Designers 
Notable artists and designers associated with Footprints include.

 Phyllis Barron
 Joyce Clissold
 Marion Dorn
 Erik Kennington
 Elspeth Little
 Len Lye
 Enid Marx
 Paul Nash
 Gwen Pike
 Doris Scull
 Margaret Stansfield
 Germaine Tallents
 Norman Wilkinson

Collections 
Footprints studio work is held in museum collections in the UK.

 Works in the collection of the Victoria and Albert Museum
 Works in the Central Saint Martins Museum and Study Collection

References 

Textile arts
Modernism
British artist groups and collectives